Kročehlavy is a part of the industrial city of Kladno in the Czech Republic. About 36,000 inhabitants live there.

In history, Kročehlavy was a stand-alone village. The first mention of Kročehlavy, dating back to 1316, is found in local records relating to a member of lower Czech nobility, Zdeněk Kladenský from Kladno.

Prior to the 19th century, the population Kročehlavy was about 130 people. After the growth of coal mining and metallurgic industry the population soared multiple times. Kročehlavy was first merged with Kladno in 1938, which lasted for a few years. They merged again in 1948 and remain so to this day.

Notable people
Karel Kolský, football coach
Josef Košťálek, footballer
Václav Horák, footballer

References

Neighbourhoods in the Czech Republic
Populated places in Kladno District
Kladno